As I Die is an EP by British metal band Paradise Lost. The title track was covered by Finnish symphonic death metal band Eternal Tears of Sorrow as a bonus track on their album A Virgin and a Whore.

Track listing 
 "As I Die" – 3:51
 "Rape of Virtue" – 4:48
 "Death Walks Behind You" – 6:30 (cover of an Atomic Rooster song)
 "Eternal" (recorded live in Amsterdam 1992 on the Shades of God European Tour) – 4:29

References 

Paradise Lost (band) albums
1993 debut EPs
Albums with cover art by Dave McKean